Campocologno railway station is a railway station in the municipality of Brusio, in the Swiss canton of Graubünden. It is located at the border between Italy and Switzerland and is an intermediate stop on the  Bernina line of the Rhaetian Railway. Hourly services operate on this line.

Services
The following services stop at Campocologno:

 Regio: hourly service between St. Moritz and Tirano.

References

External links
 
 

Railway stations in Switzerland opened in 1908
Railway stations in Graubünden
Rhaetian Railway stations
20th-century architecture in Switzerland